Aglaops aurantialis is a moth in the family Crambidae. It was described by Eugene G. Munroe and Akira Mutuura in 1968. It is found in Japan, Russia and Zhejiang, China.

References

Moths described in 1968
Pyraustinae
Moths of Asia